The Kokcha River is located in northeastern Afghanistan. A tributary of the Panj river, it flows through Badakhshan Province in the Hindu Kush. It is named after the Koksha Valley.  The city of Feyzabad lies along the Kokcha. Near the village of Artin Jelow there is a bridge over the river.

Course 
The Kokcha begins in Kuran wa Munjan District near the district center of Kuran wa Munjan and flows north, passing through Yamgan District and Jurm District. Near the village of Baharak, the Warduj river meets the Kokcha. The river then flows east, going around the northern border of Argo District and passing Feyzabad. Finally, the Kokcha enters Takhar Province, flows around the southern border of Rustaq District, and ends at the Amu Darya by Ai-Khanoum.

See also
List of rivers of Afghanistan
Teshkan Bridge

References

External links

Streamflow Characteristics of Afghanistan
Map of Watersheds of Afghanistan
Takhar Province Reference Map
Flickr images

Rivers of Afghanistan
Landforms of Takhar Province
Landforms of Badakhshan Province